The following is a list of state highways in the U.S. state of Louisiana designated in the 3250–3299 range.


Louisiana Highway 3250

Louisiana Highway 3250 (LA 3250) runs  in a southwest to northeast direction along Sugar House Road from the concurrent US 71/US 167 Bus. to LA 1208-4 in Alexandria.

The route is a short connector that has a half diamond interchange with I-49 at exit 81.  It allows two-way access between I-49 and US 71 north of the actual interchange between them, where those movements are not permitted.  LA 3250 is signed east–west and is generally an undivided four-lane highway.

Louisiana Highway 3251

Louisiana Highway 3251 (LA 3251) runs  in a southwest to northeast direction along Ashland Road from LA 75 to LA 30 west of Gonzales.

LA 3251 is an undivided two-lane highway for its entire length.

Louisiana Highway 3252

Louisiana Highway 3252 (LA 3252) runs  in a general east–west direction from LA 573 north of Holly Ridge to LA 892 at Mayflower.

Louisiana Highway 3253

Louisiana Highway 3253 (LA 3253) runs  in a southeast to northwest direction from the I-49/US 167 service road to a junction with US 190 in Opelousas.

The route is a remnant of the original alignment of LA 31, which was relocated when US 167 was upgraded to a controlled-access highway as part of the construction of I-49 during the 1980s.  LA 3253 is an undivided two-lane highway for its entire length.

Louisiana Highway 3254

Louisiana Highway 3254 (LA 3254) runs  in an east–west direction along Oscar Rivette Street from the junction of LA 31 and LA 347 in Leonville to a local road at the eastern corporate limits.  The route's mileposts increase from the eastern end contrary to common practice.  LA 3254 is an undivided two-lane highway for its entire length.

Louisiana Highway 3255

Louisiana Highway 3255 (LA 3255) runs  in a general north–south direction from the junction of two local roads southwest of Felixville to a junction with LA 432 at Felixville.

Louisiana Highway 3256

Louisiana Highway 3256 (LA 3256) runs  in a general east–west direction from US 90 to the I-10 service road east of Lake Charles.

Louisiana Highway 3257

Louisiana Highway 3257 (LA 3257) runs  in a north–south direction along Privateer Boulevard through the community of Barataria between Bayou Rigolettes and Bayou Villars.

The route follows the west bank of Bayou Barataria and is only connected to another through route by a swing bridge spanning the bayou on LA 302 (Fisherman Boulevard, formerly Kerner Street).  LA 3257 is an undivided two-lane highway for its entire length.

Louisiana Highway 3258

Louisiana Highway 3258 (LA 3258) runs  in an east–west direction from the I-10 service road west of Iowa, Calcasieu Parish to a second junction with the service road west of Lacassine, Jefferson Davis Parish.

Louisiana Highway 3259

Louisiana Highway 3259 (LA 3259) runs  in a northwest to southeast direction along East Hardtner Drive from LA 125 to US 165 in Urania.

The route connects the small town of Urania with the current four-lane alignment of US 165, which bypassed the original two-lane alignment through town now followed by LA 125.  LA 3259 is an undivided two-lane highway for its entire route and was previously designated as LA 125 Spur.

Louisiana Highway 3260

Louisiana Highway 3260 (LA 3260) ran  in an east–west direction along West Church Street from US 190 to US 51 in Hammond.

LA 3260 continued the trajectory of US 190 as the latter makes a slight S-curve heading east toward downtown Hammond. LA 3260 was an undivided two-lane highway for its entire length.

For a time in the 1950s, LA 3260 was designated on departmental maps as LA 190, a rare duplication between a U.S. and state route number after the 1955 Louisiana Highway renumbering.

LA 3260 was deleted in 2018 as part of the La DOTD's Road Transfer program.

Louisiana Highway 3261

Louisiana Highway 3261 (LA 3261) ran  in a north–south direction along Shrewsbury Road from Lausat Street to the junction of US 61 (Airline Drive) and LA 611-9 (Severn Avenue) in Metairie.  It was an undivided two-lane highway for its entire length.

The route was formerly part of LA 611-3, which originally included the entirety of Shrewsbury Road, including a grade crossing with the Illinois Central Railroad line (now the Canadian National Railway).  The crossing was closed to traffic in June 1957 following the completion of the parallel Causeway Boulevard (LA 3046) overpass.  Later, the construction of Earhart Expressway (LA 3139) through the area created a second barrier.  In the early 1990s, La DOTD renumbered several highways whose routes had become discontinuous.  The northern portion of Shrewsbury Road thus became LA 3261 until being transferred to local control in 2010.

Louisiana Highway 3262

Louisiana Highway 3262 (LA 3262) ran  in a north–south direction from a dead end to a junction with LA 611-9 in Metairie.

The route began on the north side of LA 3139 (Earhart Expressway) and headed north on Labarre Road across US 61 (Airline Drive) to its terminus at LA 611-9 (Metairie Road) in a neighborhood known as Old Metairie.  LA 3262 was an undivided two-lane highway for its entire length.

LA 3262 was formerly part of LA 611-4, which originally included the entirety of Labarre Road, including a grade crossing with the Illinois Central Railroad line (now the Canadian National Railway).  The crossing was closed to traffic in June 1957 following the completion of the parallel Causeway Boulevard (LA 3046) overpass.  Later, the construction of Earhart Expressway (LA 3139) through the area created a second barrier.  In the early 1990s, La DOTD renumbered several highways whose routes had become discontinuous.  The northern portion of Labarre Road thus became LA 3262 until being transferred to local control in 2010.

Louisiana Highway 3263

Louisiana Highway 3263 (LA 3263) ran  in a north–south direction along Pinegrove Drive from LA 107 to LA 28 east of Pineville.

Louisiana Highway 3264

Louisiana Highway 3264 (LA 3264) runs  in an east–west direction along Trinity Road from LA 124 to a local road north of Jonesville.

Louisiana Highway 3265

Louisiana Highway 3265 (LA 3265) runs  in an east–west direction along Robinson Bridge Road from US 165 to a point east of I-49 in Woodworth.

The route connects the town of Woodworth, situated along US 165 south of Alexandria, with I-49 (exit 73).  It is an undivided two-lane highway for most of its length.

Louisiana Highway 3266

Louisiana Highway 3266 (LA 3266) runs  in a north–south direction from LA 308 to a local road northwest of Thibodaux.

The route begins at a point on LA 308 just north and west of the Thibodaux city limits opposite a bridge across Bayou Lafourche that connects with LA 1.  LA 3266 heads north as an undivided two-lane highway until reaching its terminus at Forty Arpent Road.

Louisiana Highway 3267

Louisiana Highway 3267 (LA 3267) runs  in a general southwest to northeast direction from LA 82 south of Abbeville to LA 14 in Abbeville.

The route serves as part of the LA 82 truck route around the center of Abbeville.  It is an undivided two-lane highway for its entire length.

Louisiana Highway 3269

Louisiana Highway 3269 (LA 3269) runs  in a northwest to southeast direction, looping off of LA 15 in Spearsville.

Louisiana Highway 3274

Louisiana Highway 3274 (LA 3274) runs  in a north–south direction from LA 44 to US 61 in Gramercy.

The route heads north on South Airline Avenue from LA 44 (Jefferson Highway) through the town of Gramercy.  After intersecting LA 641 (Main Street), the local name becomes North Airline Avenue.  Continuing northward, LA 3274 crosses LA 3125 before ending at a junction with US 61 (Airline Highway).  LA 3274 is an undivided two-lane highway for its entire length.

LA 3274 was formerly part of LA 20 and connected to the remainder of that route via the Vacherie–Lutcher Ferry across the Mississippi River until that service was replaced by the nearby Veterans Memorial Bridge (or Gramercy Bridge) on LA 3213.

Louisiana Highway 3275

Louisiana Highway 3275 (LA 3275) runs  in a north–south direction along Sterlington Road, consisting of a partially one-way connector between US 165 and the concurrent US 80/US 165 Bus. in Monroe.  The route's mileposts increase from the northern end contrary to common practice.

Louisiana Highway 3276

Louisiana Highway 3276 (LA 3276) runs  in an east–west direction along Stonewall–Frierson Road from US 171 in Stonewall to a point east of I-49.

Louisiana Highway 3277

Louisiana Highway 3277 (LA 3277) runs  in a general north–south direction from US 190 in Basile to LA 104 northeast of Basile.

The route was renumbered in 1994 from its original designation as LA 371 to prevent a numerical duplication with the newly commissioned US 371.

Louisiana Highway 3278

Louisiana Highway 3278 (LA 3278) runs  in an east–west direction from LA 504 to LA 6 in Natchitoches.

The route is a remnant of the original two-lane alignment of LA 6.

Louisiana Highway 3279

Louisiana Highway 3279 (LA 3279) runs  in a north–south direction along Parish Road from LA 1 to LA 490 east of Chopin.

The route serves as a connector from LA 1 to LA 490 between Galbraith and Marco.  It facilitates access from northbound LA 1 to the Red River Lock and Dam opposite Colfax.  LA 3278 is an undivided two-lane highway for its entire length.

Louisiana Highway 3280

Louisiana Highway 3280 (LA 3280) runs  in an east–west direction, consisting solely of the state-maintained Endom Bridge across the Ouachita River constructed in 2003.  The route's mileposts increase from the eastern end contrary to common practice.

The swing bridge connects Coleman Avenue in West Monroe with DeSiard Street in Monroe.  LA 3280 is an undivided two-lane highway for its entire length.

Louisiana Highway 3281

Louisiana Highway 3281 (LA 3281) runs  in an east–west direction along Park Street from a point near Betty Street to a junction with the concurrent LA 15/LA 33 in Farmerville.  The route's mileposts increase from the eastern end contrary to common practice.

, it is the highest numbered state highway in active service.

Louisiana Highway 3282

Louisiana Highway 3282 (LA 3282) ran  in an east–west direction along Centerville Street East from LA 16 to LA 1031 in Denham Springs.

The route was transferred to local control in 2017 as part of the La DOTD Road Transfer Program.

Louisiana Highway 3284

Louisiana Highway 3284 (LA 3284) ran  in an east–west direction along Forsythe Avenue from LA 840-6 to US 165 in Monroe.

Louisiana Highway 3285

Louisiana Highway 3285 (LA 3285) ran  in a north–south direction along Old Highway 16 from LA 1019 to LA 16 in Watson.

As its local name indicates, LA 3285 was a bypassed section of LA 16 that remained in the state highway system for a time.  It was formerly designated as LA 16 Spur.  LA 3285 was an undivided two-lane highway for its entire length.

Louisiana Highway 3286

Louisiana Highway 3286 (LA 3286) ran  in an east–west direction along Linda Ann Avenue off of US 90 and LA 24 in Gray.

See also

References

Footnotes

Works cited

External links
Maps / GIS Data Homepage, Louisiana Department of Transportation and Development